Häusler is a common surname of Germanic origin, sometimes romanized as Haeusler. Its variant forms include Hausler, Häussler, Hausner and Häusner.

Notable people 
Charles A. Hausler (1889–1971), American architect
Cherie Hausler, Australian TV presenter of the Nine Network quiz show The Mint (Australia)
Claudia Häusler (born 1985), German professional cyclist
Laurel Hausler, contemporary oil painter and sculptor
Moritz Häusler (born 1901), Austrian football inside forward who played professionally in Austria and the United States